N. Ganapathy was an Indian politician of the Dravida Munnetra Kazhagam and Member of the Legislative Assembly of Tamil Nadufrom  Papanasam Thanjavur District. He served as the Deputy Speaker of the Tamil Nadu Legislative Assembly from 1973 to 1977. He was again a Member of the Legislative Assembly in 1989-1991 from Mylapore Constituency in Chennai City. Mr. Ganapathy was also a brilliant lawyer headed the law firm Pathy & Sundaram practising in the Madras High Court. 
Mr. Ganapathy worked with Mr. G. Ramaswamy former Attorney General of India.

Notes 

Year of birth missing (living people)
Tamil Nadu politicians
Deputy Speakers of the Tamil Nadu Legislative Assembly
20th-century Indian lawyers
Possibly living people